Garisheh (also Romanized as Garīsheh and Gerīsheh) is a village in Moqam Rural District, Shibkaveh District, Bandar Lengeh County, Hormozgan Province, Iran. At the 2006 census, its population was 200, in 41 families.

References 

Populated places in Bandar Lengeh County